Line 4 is a rapid transit line of the Madrid Metro containing 23 stations. Originally opened in 1944, the line has been extended many times over the years and is now one of the busiest lines in the Madrid system.

History

On 11 April 2007, an extension further to the current terminus at  opened. At this station, passengers can transfer to Line 1 as well as Metro Ligero Line 1 (ML-1). This station uses an island platform is for departures and a side platform for arrivals.

Rolling stock
Line 4 has used four-car trains of the CAF class 3400 since 2007.

Stations

See also
 Madrid
 Transport in Madrid
 List of Madrid Metro stations
 List of metro systems

References

External links

  Madrid Metro (official website)
 Schematic map of the Metro network – from the official site 
 Madrid at UrbanRail.net
 ENGLISH User guide, ticket types, airport supplement and timings
 Network map (real-distance)
 Madrid Metro Map

04 (Madrid Metro)
Railway lines opened in 1944
1944 establishments in Spain